Osów  (formerly German Neu Ulm) is a village in the administrative district of Gmina Drezdenko, within Strzelce-Drezdenko County, Lubusz Voivodeship, in western Poland.

For more information, see Territorial changes of Poland after World War II.

References

Villages in Strzelce-Drezdenko County